Aaron Abbas was a Jewish editor and printer at Amsterdam, at the beginning of the eighteenth century. He was the publisher of two works: (1) Aaron Peraḥyah's responsa, known under the name of "Peraḥ Maṭṭeh Aharon" (Amsterdam, 1703), the title-page of which is adorned with artistic woodcuts representing scenes from the life of the high priest Aaron. The book contains, in the nature of a preface, a dedicatory epistle, by Azriel ha-Kohen Peraḥyah, addressed to Isaac Emanuel Belmonte and Solomon Curiel. (2) The Talmudic treatise Ḥagigah (Amsterdam, 1706), which seems to have formed part of an attempted complete edition of the Babylonian Talmud by various editors.

References

18th-century Dutch writers
18th-century male writers
Dutch publishers (people)
Dutch Jews
Writers from Amsterdam
Dutch printers
Year of birth unknown
Year of death unknown